Clermont is an unincorporated community located within Dennis Township in Cape May County, New Jersey, United States.

A post office was established in 1886, with Chester Todd as the first postmaster.

References

Dennis Township, New Jersey
Unincorporated communities in Cape May County, New Jersey
Unincorporated communities in New Jersey